The defense industry of Turkey has a long history, dated from the Ottoman Empire and changed several times.

Historical development

General

The first initiative in establishing a defense industry (Ottoman Turkish: İmalat-ı Harbiye) in Turkey goes back to the period of the Ottoman Empire. Defense industry which had a strong position up until the 17th century, stayed outside the technological developments in Europe since the 18th century and has totally lost its impact starting from World War I.

Thus, no significant defense industry infrastructure was present during the first years of the Republic and activities in this domain were limited to the establishment of new facilities near Ankara during the Turkish War of Independence. Having the view that defence industry is a part of the overall industrialization and development, the Republican Administration supported the State's guidance in industrialization and therefore the defense industry during the first planning period. Despite such activities as the in-country aircraft production, a strong –infrastructure could not be established due to internal and external conditions.

In the post World War II Period, activities in defense industry initiated during the first years of the Republic were not sufficient due to lack of State support, which came to a halt as a result of the foreign military aid received upon promotion of bilateral relations with the United States and Turkey's membership of NATO.

However, regional problems Turkey faced in the 1960s, Cyprus crises in 1963 and 1967, Turkish invasion of Cyprus in 1974 and the arms embargo following the invasion necessitated the development of a defence industry based on national resources. After 1974, Turkish Armed Forces Foundation were established with this understanding and some investments, though limited were initiated.

Besides the administrative and financial difficulties in maintaining and improving the national capabilities, limited national resources as well as the procurement policies proved insufficient to fill the increasing gap in Turkish Armed Forces defence equipment.

1923-1950

Machinery, craftsmen and workmen transferred discreetly from Istanbul and its surroundings at the end of the First World War played a crucial role in winning the War of Independence. Small scale and simple workshops in Ankara, Konya, Eskişehir, Keskin and Erzurum not only provided light weapons and ammunition but also lay the foundation for a sound local defence industry infrastructure.

General Directorate of Military Facilities was set up in 1921. Establishing and industry of weapons and ammunition was discussed for the first time during the İzmir Congress of Economics. In 1924 a facility for repair of light weapons and artillery and another facility for ammunition and carpenter work in Ankara; in 1924 a new ammunition facility in Ankara; in 1930 a capsule facility in Kayaş; in 1931 a power plant and steel facility in Kırıkkale ; in 1936 a facility for gunpowder, rifle and artillery; in 1943 a facility for gas masks in Mamak were established. In addition, Nuri KILLIGİL facility set up near Haliç region, İstanbul; in 1930 was then one of two private firms producing weapons. Producing pistols, 81 mm mortar and its ammunition, explosives and pyrotechnics, this facility provided support to the Turkish Armed Forces during World War II.

In 1924, Gölcük Shipyard was set up for the maintenance of Yavuz battle cruiser. In 1941, Taşkızak Shipyard was reactivated.

Turkish aviation industry was initiated through the establishment of Tayyare ve Motor Türk AŞ (TamTAŞ) in 1926. The facilities of TamTAŞ established in Kayseri, started production in 1928; until 1939, a total of 112 aircraft –15 German Junkers A-20s, 15 US Hawk fighters, 10 US Fledgling trainers, 15 German Gotha liaison aircraft –were produced. After completion of the maintenance of the aircraft in the inventory of the Turkish Air Force Command, TamTAŞ suspended aircraft production in 1939.

24 Nu. 37 aircraft and many gliders were produced in the aircraft facility founded by Nuri DEMİRDAĞ in Istanbul in 1936. but this private firm was out of operation in 1943.

The first major initiative in the aviation industry was the formation of an aircraft facility by Turkish Aviation Association in Ankara, 1941. Starting production in 1944, this facility produced 80 Miles Magister trainer aircraft, two –engine ambulance aircraft THK-10 light transport aircraft, 60 Ugur two-seater trainer aircraft and various types of gliders. The first aircraft engine facility was set up in Ankara, in 1945 and started production in 1948. various facilities were established in Malatya between 1942 and 1943 in order to repair and maintain the aircraft procured from the United Kingdom during the IInd World War.

Foreign military aid that started upon Turkey's membership in NATO and increased within a short period stalled the development of local defence industry which was at its preliminary stage of formation.

1950-1960

Instead of improving the local defence industry, foreign aid and foreign procurement were practiced during this period. Because of the Cold War and military and political polarization after the 2nd World War, Turkey met its defence requirements through and in the framework of the NATO.

Within the impact of the increasing foreign aid in the post-IInd World War period, efforts for the development of local defence industry slowed down; orders of the Turkish Armed Forces from the local suppliers decreased, thus military facilities became a part of the Machinery and Chemical Industry Corporation (MKEK) which was formed as a State Economic Enterprise on 15 March 1950.

Development of, weaponry and equipment in the inventory of the Turkish Armed Forces was kept on the agenda by the Research and Development Department formed in 1954 under the Ministry of Defence in 1970, development studies of defence industry were reactivated.

1960-1970

It was a period regional conflicts and the Cyprus issue. Cyprus crises in 1963 and 1967 and the Turkish invasion of Cyprus in 1974, the arms embargo imposed on Turkey as a result of this invasion proved the need for a national defence industry. During the crises, Turkey was face with the difficulty of dependence on foreign supply. The deadlock experienced in this period caused to seek ways to reactivate national defence industry. During this period in which investments based on import substitution were common, production of G-3 and MG-3 rifles by the MKEK under German licenses were concrete examples of this policy put into practice.

1970–1980

1970s have been the period in which solid initiatives were put into force so as to establish a national defence industry. As a result of the national reaction to the arms embargo against Turkey, Armed Forces Foundation were established. Although these Foundations formed enterprises such as Aselsan, Havelsan, Aspilsan thanks to the donations, it was soon realized that the actual need for a defence industry as required by the contemporary age could not be met through the Foundations.

1980-1985

In the 1980s, state initiative was undertaken to realize the modernization of the Turkish Armed Forces and the establishment of a national defence industry based on contemporary technology was set as the primary goal.

The first step in this direction was taken by the establishment of defence equipment Directorate as a state enterprise. However, the shortcomings stemming from its state-bound status prevented the success and all the properties of that enterprise were transferred to the Undersecretariat for Defense Industries (SSM) which was established in 1985 under the Law No: 3238

Today's Turkish defense industry

One of the main tasks of the Defense Industries is to re-organize and integrate the existing national industry so as to satisfy defence industry requirements, encourage new enterprises and channel them according to the integration and requirements, seek possibilities for foreign capital and technology contribution, guide enterprises and make plans for state participation in this respect.

The Turkish defense industry is able to manufacture national and local products, and has a wide-ranging research and development program among which the main supporting organization is TÜBİTAK.

Investment in sub-system producers increased, forming tech centers such as Teknokent, with small and medium-sized enterprises, research institutions and universities. This was further boosted by its growing exports of weaponry.

UN figures published in 2014 show Turkey, China and the Czech Republic joining the list of the world's top exporters of small arms, which is led by the United States.

The United States imposed sanctions on Turkey and targeted its Defence Industries Directorate in December 2020 over its purchase of Russian S-400 air-defence system.

Companies

 Air platforms
ALP
Baykar
GLOBAL
KALE AERO
Turkish Aerospace Industries (TAI)
Turkish Technic
TUSAS Engine Industries Inc. (TEI)
VESTEL SAVUNMA
 Battery and power systems
ASPILSAN
GENPOWER
 Electronic and software

ASELSAN
AYESAŞ
Altay Yazilim Savunma Endüstriyel Ticaret A.Ş.
EHSİM
ESDAŞ
GATE
HTR
MİKES
NETAŞ
SAVRONİK
SDT Space & Defence Technologies
SELEX
Transvaro
TUALCOM
TUBITAK-UEKAE
Vestel
YALTES
YÜKSEK TEKNOLOJİ
YÜKSEL SAVUNMA
VENDEKA SAVUNMA
 Information technology
C TECH
HAVELSAN
KOÇ SİSTEM
KALETRON
Meteksan Savunma
MİLSOFT
ONUR MUHENDISLIK
STM
 Land platforms

ASMAŞ
BMC
FNSS Defence Systems
HEMA
Katmerciler
Moğol Makina
KOLUMAN 
MTU
Nurol Holding
Otokar
 Naval platforms
ADIK
Ares Shipyard
DEARSAN
Gölcük Naval Shipyard
ISTANBUL SHIPYARD
MILSYS SAVUNMA TEKNOLOJİLERİ
Pendik Naval Shipyard
RMK
SEDEF
YONCA-ONUK
YILDIZ
 Rocket-missile ammunition
BARIŞ
GİRSAN
MKEK
ROKETSAN
SARSILMAZ
TAPASAN
TİSAŞ

Products

Land platforms and modernizations

 Wheeled armoured vehicles
Cobra
Cobra amphibious Version
Cobra with 12.7 mm Cupola/Turret
Otokar Yavuz
 Otokar Kaya
APC cupola (with Cupola/Turret) (4x4)
AKREP with Single 7.62 mm GPMG Ows
AKREP Mobile Ground Surveillance System
 ILGAZ II 4X4
RN-94
FNSS Pars
Nurol Ejder
Otokar Akrep ZPT
SYHK Amphibious armoured vehicle-launched bridge.
BMC Kirpi
BMC Vuran
 Armoured tracked vehicles 
ACV 300 IFV 12.7
ACV 300 IFV 40
ACV AAPC
ACV AAV TOW- Anti Armor Vehicle
ACV AFOV - Artillery Forward Observation Vehicle
ACV CP - Command Post Vehicle
ACV ENG RECCE - Armored Engineering Recce Vehicle
ACV IFV 25
ACV MES-V - Modular Electronic System Vehicle
ACV MEV- Medical Evacuation Vehicle
ACV RV- Armored Recovery Vehicle
ACV SIGNALS - Armored Signals Vehicle
ACV SPM 81 - Self Propelled Mortar Vehicle with 81mm Mortar
ACV SPM RUAG 120 - Self Propelled Mortar, 120mm RUAG Mortar
ACV SPM TDA 120 - Self Propelled Mortar, 120mm TDA 2R2M Mortar
ACV-S AESV
Stretched ACV-S IFV 25 One-Man 25mm Sharpshooter Turret-S
ACV-S IFV 30 Two-Man 30mm Bradley Turret-S
ACV-S IFV 40 40mm AGL and 7.62mm Turret-S
ACV-S SPM 120 Self Propelled Mortar Vehicle with 120mm Mortar
ACV-S SW BMP-3 Turret
ACV-S TLC Tracked Logistics Carrier
M113 (A2T2)
AZMİM Amphibious combat engineering armoured bulldozer.
Tulpar

 Tank modernizations
M60T SABRA Mk3
Leopard 1T
Leopard 2NG
 Tanks
MİTÜP Altay
 Light Tanks
Kaplan MT (Joint production with Indonesia)
Tulpar LT

 Other vehicles
BMC (215-09 2.5 Ton Wheeled Tactical Vehicle (4x4))
BMC (235-16 5 Ton Wheeled Tactical Vehicle (4x4))
BMC (380-26 10 Ton Wheeled Tactical Vehicle (6x6))
 Vehicle equipment
Automatic Fire/Explosion Sensing and Suppression Systems
Bilge Pump (M113)
Bilge Pump (M48)
Commander's Cupola
Driver Periscope (AN/VVS-2A)
Full Transmission
Glass Periscope (M17)
Illuminating Instruments
Kupola for Armoured Personnel carriers
Main Gun Smoke Extraction Fan
Night Vision System (DNTSS- ACV)
Periscope (M36E1/M32E1)
Personnel Heaters
Sharpshooter Turret - 25 mm One-Man Sharpshooter Turret
T-840 and T-44 Turret
Tank Engine Heater
Tank Thermal Sight System (TTS)
Tank Transmissions
Thermal Fire Control System (Eagle Eye)
Transmissions

Naval platforms
 

 Naval combatants
Barbaros class frigate (licensed)
Yavuz class frigate (licensed)
Coast Guard Search and Rescue Ship
Type 209 submarine (licensed)
Kılıç class fast attack craft Type FPB
Milgem Patrol and Anti-Submarine Warfare Ship
Mine Detection Ship
New Type Patrol Boat
  Patrol and amphibious ships
Cabin RIB Boat (JF 830 / JF 833)
Coast Guard Boats (SAR35, SGB37)
KAAN 15 Class ONUK MRTP-15
KAAN 20 Class ONUK MRTP-20
KAAN 29 Class ONUK MRTP-29
KAAN 33 Class ONUK MRTP-33
KAAN 16" CLASS ONUK MRTP-16
KAAN 16" CLASS ONUK MRTP-16U
Landing Crafts, Tank (LCT Class)
Landing Crafts, LCVP Type Landing Crafts (LCT Type)
Police Boats
Turkish Type 80 Class Coast Guard Boat
Unmanned Naval Vehicle
Unmanned Marine Vehicle
Water Jet RHIB (JP 24 Jet)
  Support ships
Akar class supertanker Type Support Ship
Fortification Boat 450
anding and Mine Laying Ships (LST Type)
MSH Boat
Tug Boats / Torpedo Tender
TCG. YB. Kudret Güngör Ship
Underwater Vehicle (AUV)
 Naval construction materials, sub systems and support systems
AIS Automatic Identification System Electronic Chart System (ECS) Software
A-595 Surface Supply and Combat Support Ship
Diesel Marin Engines
Diver Detection Sonar
Docking Up to 4500 Tons and Pier Facilities
Dry Dock Measurement System
Echo Sounder
Electro catalytic Chlorination Unit
Floating Pool and Dry Pool
Frigate Power Transmission and Distribution Switchboard Panels
Hull Scanner
National Sonar Wet End Prototype
Hydrophones
Marine Genset (3,5KW - 80KW)
Message Terminal Unit (TB-2000)
Military Type Rugged Consoles
Naval Platform Radar Electronic Support System (ARES-2N)
Ocean Bottom Seismometer
Operator Console (OPCON)
Passive Harbour Protection System
Remote Operated Vehicle (ROV)
Seafloor Sediment Sampler
Side-Scan Sonar System
Sonar (Multi-beam)
Shipboard Integrated Battle Command System
Stabilized Machine Gun Platform (STAMP)
Sub System Adaptation Unit (SAU)
Submarine Battery Production
Submarine Power Transmission and Distribution Switchboard Panels
Submarine and Auxiliary Ships Programs Support and Consultancy Services
Tank Level Measurement System
Underwater Acoustic Modeling
Underwater Cables and Connectors
UW-Monitor
Various Parts for Ships
Vessel Communication Switching System
Video Recording Unit (VRU)

Air platforms

 Licensed and main products
F-16 Fighting Falcon (Licensed)
F-35 Lightning II (Joint Production)
Boeing 737 AEW&C (Joint Production)
Airbus A400M (Joint Production)
CASA CN-235 (Licensed)
TAI/AgustaWestland T129 ATAK (Patent bought, local production)
Eurocopter AS 532 (Licensed)
Turkish Primary and Basic Training Aircraft (HÜRKUŞ) (Local)
Combat Proven Rotary Wing Loitering Munition System (KARGU)
 Modernizations
C-130E/B Avionics Modernization (ERCIYES) Program
F-16 CCIP Modernization
F-16 ÖZGÜR modernization
Meltem II (Modification of CN235)
Open Skies Aircraft (ASA) (Modification of CN-235)
 Unmanned aerial vehicles (UAVs) 
 

Target Drone (TAI Turna/G)
Tracking Target Drone (TAI Keklik)
MALE Unmanned Aerial Vehicle (TAI Anka)
Mini Unmanned Aerial Vehicle (Bayraktar Mini UAV)
Mini Unmanned Helicopter (TAI Malazgirt Mini VTOL)

 Aircraft and helicopter engines and equipment
3D CAD Design and analysis capabilities for aerospace industry. (Parts and Assembly design)
Accessories for aeroplanes
Aerostructures Manufacturing
Airbus Aktuator Valves
Aircraft and Helicopter Engine Assembly and Overhaul
Aircraft and Helicopter Engine Part Manufacturing
Auto pilot modules
ATR PC Chassis
Flight Management System (CDU-900)
GPS Sistemi (LN-100G INS/GPS)
Have Quick I-II / SATURN (optional) Frequency Hopping VHF/UHF Air Platform Radios
Helicopter Chaff/Flare Dispenser Integration Analyses Work Package
Helicopter Flight Control and Aircraft Engine Parts
Helicopter Tactical Data Link System (HELIS)
Lighting Control Panel (MELTEM II Project)
Missile Remote Interface Unit
Multifunction Display (MFD-268 E)
Production of Plane Heater and Helicopter Heater
Avionic Central Control Computer (SOFTWARE)
Composite Part / Component Design, Analysis and Production
Avionic Central Control Computer (SOFTWARE)
Unmanned Aerial Vehicles Internal Combustion Engines
Turbojet AT225
Turboprop AT225
 Training equipment and simulators
3D Modelling
Air Defence Systems Effectiveness Simulation Programs, Guided Missile Simulation Programs, Weapon Simulations for Classroom Training
Air Traffic Control Simulations
Analysis and Simulation Systems (DUMAN)
Armoured Vehicle and Tank Simulators
Artillery Forward Observer and Fire Management Center Simulator
Avionics Video Symbols Generation Software (ALQ-178 AVSG)
Digital Environment Simulatorr (DES)
Digital Feature Analysis Data (DFAD) Level – 1 for Aircraft Simulations
Digital Feature Analysis Data (DFAD) Level – 2 for Aircraft Simulations
Digital Terrain Elevation Data (DTED) Level - 1 for Aircraft Simulations
Digital Terrain Elevation Data (DTED) Level - 2 for Aircraft Simulations
Electronic Warfare Operator Training Simulator (EHOPES)
Interactive Shooting Simulator (AES-800 / TANUS 2004)
Joint Electronic Warfare Training Simulators (JETS)
Joint Task Force Tactical and Operational Simulation System (MGKMOS)
Laser Based Combat Training System
Laser Marksmanship Training Simulators
LINK-1 Simulator
Marksman Training Simulators
Military / Educational Console Set
Modelling and Simulator
Mortar Simulator
Sea Surveillance Radar Simulator (APS143)
Ship Simulator (SHIPSIM)
Shooting Training Remote Controller - Standalone (AKS 1919 RC)
Shooting Training Systems (AES 2023)
Simulation Recording (DUMAN)
Simulation Systems and NASCAP Remote Networked NBC Detection and Management System (NBC)
Small Caliber Arms Interactive Shooting Training System (EE/RangeMaster2005 GS)
Small Scaled Tactical and Operational Simulation System (BASKIN / SAVMOS)
Software Development for Weapon Systems, Development of Simulation Software
Sonar Operator Training Simulator
Training Simulations-MAS
Training Simulations-SONOPES
Wireless Controlled Target System
Full Flight Simulator (CN 235 100 M)
Full Flight Simulator (CN 235 100 TK01)
Electronic Warfare Test and Training Range (EWTTR)
Helicopter Simulation Center Link-11 Simulator (HEL11SIM S70-B)
Helicopter Simulators (HELSİM)
Mission Support System (MSS)
Weapon Systems and Flight Training Simulators (F-4E 2020)

Artillery - rockets - missiles

 Surface-to-surface missiles
Atmaca anti-ship missile
Bora/Khan Tactical ballistic missile
 Artillery rockets 
Artillery Rocket (107 mm)
Artillery Rocket (122 mm)
Artillery Rocket System-Toros 230 Medium Range Artillery Rocket
Artillery Rocket System-Toros 260 Long Range Artillery Rocket
MK 40 MOD 3 and MK4 10 Rockets (2,75")
Multiple Launch Rocket System (107 mm)
Multi Barrel Rocket Launcher System (2,75")
Multi Barrel Rocket Launcher System and R-302T Rocket 302 mm (TRG-300 Tiger)
Multi Barrel Rocket Launcher System and TR-107 Ammunition Family (T-107 107 mm)
Multi Barrel Rocket Launcher System and TR-122 Ammunition Family (T-122 122 mm)
Yildirim SRBM
 Howitzers

T-155 155mm L52 Fırtına Self Propelled Howitzer
Towed Howitzer T-155 L52 (PANTER)
M114A2 155mm L39
M44T 155mm L39 SPH
M52T 155mm L39 SPH
-Note: The M44T and M52T is a Turkish modernization, license built Rheinmetall 155mm howitser with Turkish Fire Control Systems.

 Mortars
Commando Mortar 60 mm
Fog Mortar
Mortar 120 mm (HY1-12)
Mortar 81 mm (NT-1)
Mortar 81 mm (UT-1)
 Air defence systems 
Automatic Cannon 25 mm
Hisar (missile family)
Pedestal Mounted Stinger System (ATILGAN)
Pedestal Mounted Stinger System (BORA)
Pedestal Mounted Stinger System (ZIPKIN)
Twin Barrel Anti Aircraft and Infantry Support Gun 20 mm
KORKUT Twin Barrel Anti Aircraft Gun 35 mm
 Remote controlled weapon stations
 Aselsan SMASH 30mm RCWS
Aselsan STAMP multi caliber RCWS
Aselsan STAMP-2 multi caliber RCWS
Aselsan STAMP-G multi caliber RCWS
Aselsan STOP 25 mm RCWS

Small arms
Pistols
AKDAL F 06
AKDAL F 92
AKDAL GHOST
AKDAL MINI 03
AKDAL MINI 06
FATIH 13 - 7.65 mm
FATIH 13 - 7.65 mm
FATIH 13 - 7.65 mm
FATIH 13 380 ACP - 9.00 mm
KANUNI 16 – 9 mm
KANUNI S - 9 mm
KIRIKKALE 9 mm
KIRIKKALE 9 mm
Sarsilmaz Kilinc 2000

Sarsilmaz K2-45
Sarsilmaz CM9
Sarsilmaz ST10
YAVUZ 16 - 9 mm
YAVUZ 16 COMPACT MC Standard - 9 mm
YAVUZ 16 REGARD MC Standard - 9 mm
YAVUZ 16 TUĞRA Standard - 9 mm
YAVUZ 16 ZİRVE Standard - 9 mm
ZIGANA C45 - .45ACP Caliber
ZIGANA F - 9 mm
ZIGANA K - 9 mm
ZIGANA M16 - 9 mm
ZIGANA Sport - 9 mm
ZIGANA T - 9 mm
BERNARDELLI 13+1
BERNARDELLI 15+1
Hançer
K2 - 9 mm
Kama Long - 9 mm
Kama Sport - 9 mm
Kılınç 2000 – 9 mm
PROFESSIONAL - 9 mm
VATOZ - 9 mm

Submachine gun
MP5 A2 - 9 mm
MP5 A3 - 9 mm
MP5 A4 - 9 mm
MP5 K - 9 mm
MP5 KA4 - 9 mm
MTS2 - 9 mm
MTS3 - 9 mm

Assault rifle
G3A3 - 7.62 mm
G3A4 - 7.62 mm
HK 33 E A2 - 5.56 mm
HK 33 E A3 - 5.56 mm
T-50 - 5.56 mm

Machine gun
MG3 - 7.62 mmm

Shotgun
Churchill - 12 Gauge
Strong - 12 Gauge (pump action)
Karatay - 12 Gauge (pump action)
M12 - 12 Gauge (pump action)
M6 - 12 Gauge (pump action)
M8 - 12 Gauge (pump action)
Cobra - 12 Gauge (pump action)
Altay - 12 Gauge (semi-automatic shotgun)
Akdal MKA 1911 - 12 Gauge

Rifle
Semi Automatic Sporting Rifle T-94
Sporting Hunting Rifle T-41

Sniper rifle
Accuracy International AW - .338 Lapua
Barrett M82 - .50 BMG
TUFAN T-12
TUFAN MKE-8O - 7.62 mm

Grenade launchers
40 mm multi-barrel launcher
T-40 HK 33 E (underslung)
T-40

Rocket launchers
RPG 7 - 40 mm

Ammunition, explosives and detectors

 Ammunition
Aircraft bomb (MK82 MOD1 500 lb)
Aircraft bomb 2000 lb Mk84
Aircraft practice bomb 2000 lb Mk84
Aircraft practice bomb 25 lb BDU – 33D / B
Aircraft practice bomb 25 lb Mk 76 Mod 2
Aircraft practice bomb 4,5 lb MK106 MOD1
Aircraft practice bomb 500 lb
Aircraft Rocket Warhead 2,75" M151
Ammunition 105/35 mm MKE Mod 270
Ammunition 155 mm M396 ERDP
Ammunition 175 mm MKE Mod111
Ammunition 25 mm M791 APDS-T
Ammunition 25 mm M793 TP-T
Ammunition 40 mm MKE MOD63 GE MKE MOD 63 GE Tear Gas
Ammunition 60 mm M49A2 HE
Ammunition ICM155 mm M483 A1
Ammunition 25 mm M792 HEI-T
Anti Aircraft Ammunition 35 mm MSD 020
Anti Aircraft Ammunition 35 mm ULD 034
Artillery Ammunition 155 mm M101
Ball Cartridges 5,56 mm x 45 (SS109/M855)
Ball Cartridges 9,65 mm (.38 cal)
Ball Pistol Cartridges 7,65 mm x 17
Cartridges 7,62 mm x 51 (4 M61 +1 M62)
Cartridges 12,7 mm X 99 (.50 Cal) (4m33 + 1m17)
Cartridges 12,7 mm X 99 (.50 Cal) (M17)
Cartridges 12,7 mm X 99 (.50 Cal) (M33)
Cartridges 12,7 mm X 99 (.50 Cal) (4m8 + 1m17)
Cartridges 20 mm X 102 M56 A3 HEI (with War Head)
Cartridges 20 mm X 102 M56 A3 HEI-T (with War Head and Tracer)
Cartridges 20 mm X 110 HEI (MKE Mod 1102) (with War Head)
Cartridges 5,56 mm x 45 (4 Ball + 1 Tracer)
Cartridges 7,62 mm
Cartridges 7,62 mm x 51 (4 Ball + 1 Tracer)
Cartridges 7,62 mm x 51 (4 Ball + 1 Tracer)
Cartridges 7,62 mm x 51 Ball (M80)
Cartridges 9,65 mm (Special) (.38 cal) (FMJ)
Cartridges Products (AVF1 MOD1 YÜK ATMA, AVF2 MOD1)
Cartridges, 9 mm x 17 Short
Cartridges, Tracer 20 mm X 110 HEI-T (MKE Mod 1109) (with War Head and Tracer)
Cartridges 7,62 mm x 51 Armour Piercing (M61)
Colored Smoke Can
Fog Ammunition 120 mm MKE Mod226
Fragmented Aircraft bomb 500 LB PRE
Grenade Launcher Ammunition (MKE MOD60 HE) 40 mm
Gun Ammunition 105 mm HE MKE Mod233
Howitzer Ammunition 105 mm HE M1
Howitzer Ammunition 155 mm M107 HE
Howitzer Ammunition 8" HE M106
Illuminating Ammunition (120 mm MKE Mod 236)
lluminating Ammunition (EFAR)
Illuminating Mortar Ammunition (81 mm M301 A2)
Illuminating Rocket, Flare Surface Trip
Illuminating, Smoke Cartridge (MKE MOD3 Smoke Cartridge)
Mortar Ammunition Prefragmented 81 mm BHM
Mortar Ammunition 120 mm Cs MKE Mod 251
Mortar Ammunition 120 mm Hc MKE Mod 250
Mortar Ammunition 120 mm He MKE Mod 209
Mortar Ammunition 81 mm HE M43 A1 B1
Mortar Ammunition 81 mm HE MKE MOD 214
Mortar Ammunition 81 mm HE FRAG MKE MOD262
Mortar Ammunition Cargo 120 mm MKE Mod 258
Parabellum Pistol Cartridges 9 mm x 19
Pistol Cartridges, 9 mm x 20 Long
Practice - Target practice Mortar Ammunition 81 mm MKE MOD 238
Practice Ammunition 105 mm TpFSDS-T
Practice Ammunition 105 mm TpFSDS-T
Practice Mortar Ammunition 120 mm MKE Mod 228
Practice Mortar Ammunition 60 mm MKE MOD257
Sevrotin Hunting Cartridges, 12/70 Temporary Effective
Signal Cartridges (1", 1,5", 7/8")
Special Ball Cartridges 9,65 mm (.38 cal)
Submarine Signal with Parachute (PDK - PIK)
Tracer Cartridges 5,56 mm x 45 (L 110/M856)
Tracer Cartridges 7,62 mm x 51 (M62)
Tracer Cartridges 20 mm X 102 M55 A2 TP-T
Training Ammunition 105 mm TP MKE Mod 234
Training Ammunition 120 mm MKE Mod227
Training Ammunition 35 mm MAD356
Training Ammunition 81 mm MKE MOD216
Training Ammunition 81 mm MKE MOD239
Training Ammunition 81 mm MKE MOD273
Training Cartridges 20 mm X 102 M55 A2 TP
Training Cartridges 20 mm X 110 TP (MKE Mod 1101)
Training Cartridges 20 mm X 110 TP-T (MKE Mod 1107)
Training Grenade Launcher Cartridges, Tracer 40 mm x 46 TP-T
Training Mortar Ammunition 60 mm MKE MOD 256 HE
Waterjet disrupter Cartridges 12,7, Electrical Cartridges 12,7
 Explosives
Demolition block (  lb)
Demolition block (1 lb)
Demolition block (M5a1 2.5 lb)
Dynamite Nitrocellulose
Ether
Explosive Nitrocellulose
Hunting Capsule
Lacquers Nitrocellulose
Long and Medium Range Antitank Ammunition
Propellant 20 mm And 12,7 mm
Propellant 5,56 mm and 7,62 mm
Propellant For Pistol (Ball 9 mm)
Propellant For Rifles 12,7 mm
Propellant for Rifles 20 mm
Propellant For Rifles 7,62 mm
Propellants for Artillery Ammunition 105 mm M1
Propellants for Artillery Ammunition 105 mm M1
Propellants for Artillery Ammunition 105 mm M30
Propellants for Artillery Ammunition 106 mm M26
Propellants for Artillery Ammunition 155 mm M1
Propellants For Artillery Ammunition 155 mm M6
Propellants For Artillery Ammunition 35 MM
Propellants for Artillery Ammunition 5/38 "LİK M6
Propellants for Artillery Ammunition 8" M1
Propellants for Artillery Ammunition175 mm M6
Propellants For Mortars And Priming (M9)
Propellants For Mortars And Priming 4,2" (M9)
Rocket Nitrocellulose
The Propellants for Hunting And Sports Ammunition
Training Capsules, 2.Sound K Training Capsule
 Detectors - demilitarization systems
Bomb Demolition and Transfer Trailer
Bomb Determination and Demolition Equipments
Bomb Determination and Demolition Vehicle
Bomb Disposal System
Cobra Eod-Bratt Vehicle
Dirty bomb Disposal System
Demilitarization (Ammunition)
Metal Detector - Hand-held (HANDY)
Mine Detector (TV/PSS-12)
Mine Detectors
Mine Lying Device
Mine Propellant System
Mined Field Clearing System For Vehicles (TAMKAR)
Mined Fields Clearing System For Troops
Suspicious Package Inspection System
 Ammunition components, detonators
30 Ms Delay Copper, 30 Ms Delay Aluminum, 500 Ms Delay Aluminum
Airplane Drop bomb Composite Body (DOGAN 500 lbs.)
Aluminium And Copper Electrical Detonator
Ammunition Demilitarization Facility
Ammunition Plugs and Plug Parts
Ammunition Serving Equipment
Ammunition Rocket Igniter
Blasting Detonators
Bullet Cartridge
Bullet Casing
Electronic Time Fuse, Inductive Setter for Fuses
Hardwire Explosive Demolition Device
Multi-Purpose Combat Robot
Remote Controlled Detonation System
Time Delay Fuze Programmer
Various Ammunition Parts
 Hand grenade 
Defence Hand Grenade (MKE MOD 44 (MK2))
Defence Hand Grenade (MK2)
Hand Grenade (MKE MOD 56 Riot Control)
Sound Capsules (Anti Riot Grenade, Soundk. 1.Sound)
Training Hand Grenadee - Defence (MKE MOD 46)
 Arms, rocket and missile components
Automatic Howitzer Loading Magazine Drive Unit
Barrel Insert System (35 mm)
Composite Electrical Launching Tube Assembly (ERYX)
Composite Gas Discharge Unit
Composite Launch Tube (122 mm)
Composite Launch Tube (TOROS)
Composite Launch Tube 122 mm
Composite Pre-Firing Structure and Left Hand Handle (ERYX)
Composite War Head Body (122 mm)
Composite War Head Body (TOROS)
Composite War Head Body 122 mm
Composite Barrel Heat Jacket
Chemical Warfare Agent Detection System
Foldable Rifle Butt
G3 Rifle Improved Gun Sling
Law Launcher Pipe, Body And Fuse Box 66 mm (M72)
Missile - Ramp Plates (TÜBİTAK - SAGE TOROS)
Missiles Components
Missile Parts and Guidance System Parts Production
Night Weapon Sight (M-993 - Small Arms)
Night Weapon Sight (M-995 - Navy Guns)
Night Weapon Sight (AN/PVS-4 Small Arms)
Night Weapon Sight (AN/TVS-5 Heavy Guns)
Pistol Body And Various Parts
Plastic Parts For Rocket and Missile Systems
Rapier - MBDA Components
Rocket Pipe (2.75")
Sniper Rifle Components
STINGER Composite Coolant Reservoir Assembly
STINGER Composite Launch Tube
STINGER Gyro Activator
Stinger Motor Case
TANK GUN Components 105 mm (M68 T1)
Telescope Mount
Thermal Weapon Sight

Electronic warfare

 Airborne systems 
Counter Measures Dispensing System (SPREAD)
Electronic Warfare Self Protection System (ASES-235M)
Electronic Warfare System Self-Protection (AN/ALQ178)
Helicopter Electronic Warfare Self Protection Suit (HEWS)
Radar Warning Receiver - Integrated Defensive Aid System (MİDAS RWR)
Remote Controlled Fixed V/Uhf Direction Finding (DF) System (DFINT-3S2)
 Ground-based systems
Detector – Jammer (GK-2 GSM)
Detector (GD-2 GSM)
Electronical Intelligence and Anti-Intelligence Products
Ground Based ELINT System (DFINT-2S)
Jammer - Detector (GK-2 GSM)
Jammer (GK-1 GSM)
Jammer (RF)
Jammer (PMJ03)
Labris Antivirus / Antispam Gateway Software and Hardware
Labris Firewall, VPN, Bandwidth Management and High Availability Management Software and Hardware
Labris Intrusion Detection and Prevention Software and Hardware
Labris Server Load Balancing Software and Hardware
Labris L1-L8 Network Security Appliances
Labris URL/Content filter Software and Hardware
Land Based Electronic Support (ES) / Electronic Attack (EA) System
Mobile Direction Finding (DF) And Intelligence System (DFINT-4A)
Mobile HF Tactical Communications Jammer System (JAMINT-4)
Tactical Communications Jammer System (JAMINT 3A V/UHF)
 Shipborne systems 
Naval Platform Radar Electronic Support System (ARES-2N)
  Electronic warfare support systems
Armoured Tactical Directing Finding System
Custom Console Keyboards, Joystick, Trackbal solutions
Digital Media Modernization (SAMED - RACAL)
Electronic Warfare and Programming Simulation Systems (LR-100 EWPSS)
Electronic Warfare Operator Training Simulator (EHOPES)
Electronic Warfare Training Simulator (JETS Joint)
Infrared Signature Measurement System
Laser Target Pointer (ATOK)
Labris Antivirus / Antispam Gateway Software and Hardware
Labris Firewall, VPN, Bandwidth Management and High Availability Management Software and Hardware
Labris Intrusion Detection and Prevention Software and Hardware
Labris Server Load Balancing Software and Hardware
Labris L1-L8 Network Security Appliances
Labris URL/Content filter Software and Hardware
Monitoring and Interception Systems (DUMAN)
Radar signature prediction and analysis software (RIKA)
Realistic Microwave and Profile Radar Simulator Based on Scientific Modeling (SOFTWARE)

C4ISR

  Command, control systems
Acoustic Mission planning system (AMPS)
Air Defense Early Warning and C4I System (SKYWATCHER)
Air Defense Early Warning and C4I System Base and Harbour Defense Version (SKYWATCHER)
Arahap
Armeryol
Atimevse
Command and Control System (on Armoured Vehicle)
Maritime Patrol Aircraft Command Control Systems (MELTEM)
Labris Antivirus / Antispam Gateway Software and Hardware
Labris Firewall, VPN, Bandwidth Management and High Availability Management Software and Hardware
Labris Intrusion Detection and Prevention Software and Hardware
Labris Server Load Balancing Software and Hardware
Labris L1-L8 Network Security Appliances
Labris URL/Content filter Software and Hardware
Mini Combat System (AMICOS)
Naval Combat Systems Integration
Reconnaissance / Surveillance System on Vehicle(MARS-V)
Reconnaissance Surveillance System on Vehicle (SAHARA)
Ship Command Control System (GEMKOMSIS)
Ship Integrated Combat Management System (GENESIS)
Synthetic Aperture Radar (SAR)
Tactical Command Control System (TACCS)
Turkish Air Force Integrated Command and Control System (TICCS)
C4ISR Modeling and Simulation System
Air Traffic Control Station Recording Systems (DUMAN)
Command Control Computer (CCC)
Console Parts
Decoder and Tracking system (MITIS IFF)
Digital Media Modernization (SAMED - RACAL)
Decoder and Tracking system (MITIS IFF)
Genesis Integrated Link System (GELIS)
Genesis Tactical Data Link System – Modernization Program (GVLS-MP)
Interface Unit (BTS)
Labris Antivirus / Antispam Gateway Software and Hardware
Labris Firewall, VPN, Bandwidth Management and High Availability Management Software and Hardware
Labris Intrusion Detection and Prevention Software and Hardware
Labris Server Load Balancing Software and Hardware
Labris L1-L8 Network Security Appliances
Labris URL/Content filter Software and Hardware
Mission Computer (Aselsan)
Military Hand-Held Computer (HT-7243/A-PM)
Military Lap-top Computer (LT-7241/A)
Mobile Command Control Center
Multifunction Operator Console (MOC)
Operator Console (OPCON)
Sub System Adaptation Unit (SAU)
Survey Information Center System (YOHMS)
Tactical Information Display System (METEOR BS)
 Communication systems
Automatic Signal Information System (AQUILA HF, VHF, UHF)
Communication Planning Tool
Compas View Test Tool Kit
Field Telephone
Frequency Hopping Radio Link (GRC-5218 Band III+ 8 Mbit/s)
Genesis Tactical Data Link System – Modernization Program (GVLS-MP)
Helicopter Tactical Data Link System (HELIS)
IFF Mode-C
IFF Mode-T
IFF Systems
Integrated Communication Systems (Mobile)
Labris Antivirus / Antispam Gateway Software and Hardware
Labris Firewall, VPN, Bandwidth Management and High Availability Management Software and Hardware
Labris Intrusion Detection and Prevention Software and Hardware
Labris Server Load Balancing Software and Hardware
Labris L1-L8 Network Security Appliances
Link 11-16 Software
Message Handling System (MHS)
Multi Media Transmission Communication System (FORESC-3)
Network Security Device (AGC-100T)
Satellite Communication System (X-BAND)
Secure Voice and Data Communication Device (ÖZDEM II)
Tactical Area Communication Systems (TACOMS)
Tactical Secure Wireless Local Area Network (TS-WLAN)
Turkish Armed Forces Integrated Communication System (TAFICS)
 Radios
Airborne Transceiver - HF (SRT 170, 270, 470/L)
Digital Receiver - HF/SSB (SP-2295R)
Digital Tank/Vehicular Communication System
Frequency Hopping VHF/UHF Ground Radios (Have Quick I-II)
Ground-Air Radios (GCA 1000 Series)
Hand Radio
Multiband Multimode Handheld Radio (PRC-9651)
Multiband Multimode Manpack/Vehicular Radio (PRC/VRC-9661)
Radio (CNR 2000)
Radio (H4855 PRR)
Radio Listening and Recording Unit (APCO 25)
Radios (4700 Analog / Digital / Trunk)
Search and Rescue Hand-Held Transceiver (PRC-434A-SMT)
Transceiver - HF (SRT-2007)
Transceiver - HF (SRT-602)
Transceiver - HF/SSB (SP-2296)
Transceiver - V/UHF AM/FM (SRT 619/NV)
Transmitter HF/SSB (ST-5000 - ST-10000)
 Crypto equipment
Bulk Crypto Equipment (MİLON-6 34Mbit/s)
Bulk Crypto Equipment (MİLON-7 155 Mbit/s)
Bulk Encryption Equipment (MİLON-5 2 Mbit/s)
Crypto Key Loading Device (KAYC-10B)
Crypto Key Reading Device (KAOC-8)
Crypto Unit Design (DEMET)
Data Encryption Equipment
Data Encryption Equipment (MİLON-4A)
Electronic Crypto Key Transfer and Fill Equipment (EKATAC)
Electronic Crypto Key Transfer and Fill Equipment (EKAYUC)
Encryption Equipment (2041)
Link Encryption Equipment (EKAHAK)
Synchronous Data Encryption Equipment (SVKC)
TSK-1 ISDN BRI Crypto Equipment
TSK-2 ISDN PRI Crypto Equipment
Voice Encryption Equipment
 Other subsystems
Airborne Data Link Processor (ADLP) Software Development (ADLP-100)
AC Power Line filter (TGH-16 TEMPEST)
Business Communications Manager (BCM)
Business Secure Router (BSR 222)
Communication Systems, Power Supplies, Transmission Systems, Infrastructure Design and Manufacturing
Communications Portfolio (Meridian)
Digital Radiolink Equipment (SRC8000)
Digital Radiolink Equipment (SRC8000)
Digital Radiolink Equipment (SRL5800)
DC Power Line filter (TDC-5 TEMPEST)
Digital Terminal (ISDN)
Data Transfer Systems (Wide Band Link)
Fax Analog Digital Converter (FASD-1)
Fax Security Equipment (FGC-2)
Gateway Device Over HF-VHF-UHF/IP * FORMUS: Multi-Transmission Media Communication System (FORGEC FORMUS)
GSM Monitoring and Interception Systems (DUMAN)
Integrated Message Handling System
Multiple Optical Line Terminating Unit (MOLTU)
Message Terminal Unit (TB-2000)
Multiplexer (TN-1XE SD)
National Fillgun Equipment (MİLAY-1)
Signal Line filter (SM-10 TEMPES)
Signal Line filter (SM-5 TEMPES)
Signal Line filter Panel (SP-100 TEMPEST)
Secure Terminal Equipment (SecVoice-2)
Tactical Data/ Internet Communication Unit
Tactical Area Communications System, ISDN and ATM Terminals and ISDN Terminals (TACOMS)
Wireless and Wireline Local Area Network Switch
  Fire control systems
Automatic Fire Control and Barrel Aiming Systems for 81–120 mm Mortars
Artillery Fire Support System (TADES)
Computerized Gun Laying System
Computerized wireless Scoring Target System
Fire Control System (ATMACA)
Field Artillery Battery Fire Direction System (BAIKS-2000)
Fire Control System (for Leopard 1 Tanks - VOLKAN)
Fire Support Team Headquarter / Forward Observer's Vehicle (ADESTIM)
Fire Support Automation System (AFSAS) (ADOP-2000)
Fire Support Command Control Communication System (TAIKS)
Firing Control System (T-122 Sakarya) (BORA-2100)
Mortar Fire Direction System (HAIKS)
Naval Gun Fire Control System (76 mm FCS)
Self Propelled FIRTINA (TUSpH STORM) Howitzer Fire Control System (T-155)
Termal Fire Control System (Eeagleeye)
Thermal Sighting System With Laser Range Finder (DNTSS-LRF)
Collimator Instrument
Goniometer (Digital, ASELGON)
Muzzle Velocity Radar (7941)
Intervalometer (SEI2000-1/2)
Intervalometer (SUU-25 Flare Dispenser)
Intervalometer (Flare Dispenser) (SUU-25)
Intervalometer (Firing Control Unit) (Z02 M)
Position Periscope
Target Pointer (AIM/1D)
Target Pointer (ATOK)
Target Pointers (IRAD 2500)
Target Pointers (IRAD 600)
Target Pointers (M-9395/M-9396)
Target Pointer (M-9886)
Target Pointer (REM007/TEM007)

Sensors

 Main/subsystems
Air Defense Radar (ADR)
Field Artillery Meteorology System (AFAM)
Fixed Underwater Surveillance System (FUS)
Identification and Communication Devices (FIREFLY IR)
Labris Antivirus / Antispam Gateway Software and Hardware
Labris Firewall, VPN, Bandwidth Management and High Availability Management Software and Hardware
Labris Intrusion Detection and Prevention Software and Hardware
Labris Server Load Balancing Software and Hardware
Labris L1-L8 Network Security Appliances
Labris URL/Content filter Software and Hardware
Laser Range Finder and Target Location and Identification Systems
Mobile Underwater Surveillance System (MUS)
Milimetric Wave Radar Technics (MMWT)
Production and Depot Level Maintenance of Radar Systems
Radar Command and Control Integration System (RC2IS)
Signal and Data Processing Units
Tactical Sensor Network for Border and Regional Security (TADAS)
Wireless Sensor Network for Wire Fence Monitoring (TEDAS)
İKONOS Satellite Imagery (İNTA)
Spot 5 Satellite Imagery (İNTA)
Imagery Intelligence (İNTA)
 Thermal cameras
Airborne Thermal Imaging and Targeting System (ASELFLIR-300T)
Airborne Thermal Imaging System (ASELFLIR-200)
Electro-Optical Sensor System (FALCONEYE)
Night Observation Camera System (KESKİN GÖZ)
Night Vision Binocular (High Performance 3X)
Night Vision Weapon Sight (High Performance 4X)
Night Vision Weapon Sight (High Performance 6X)
Surveillance and Fire Adjustment Radar (ARS 2000)
Thermal Camera (KAŞİF)
Thermal Camera Modification (BAYKUŞ)
Thermal Camera Systems (BAYKUŞ)
Thermal Sight - T Series (ATS-T)
Thermal Weapon Sight (Boa)
Thermal Weapon Sight (Engerek 2)
Thermal Weapon Sight (Engerek 3+)
Thermal Weapon Sight (Piton)
 Binoculars
Binocular T 10 A1
Binocular T 10 A1r
Night Observation Device (UGG-2)
Night Vision Binocular (M1505)
Night Vision Binocular (M-978)
Night Vision Driver's Periscope (TV/VVS-2)
Night Vision Weapon Sight (HWS-6)
Observation Telescope T20A1
Position Periscope
Vision System (AN/TAS-4A)
Vision System (AN/TAS-4C)
Vision System (AN/TVS-4)
 Goggles
Monocular Night Vision Goggle (M-983)
Night Vision Goggle (AN/PVS-5A)
Night Vision Goggle (AN/PVS-7B)
Night Vision Goggle (M- 972/M-973)
Night Vision Monocular Goggle
Pilot Night Vision Goggle (M-929/M-930)
Vision System Monocular (TV/MON1)

Software

AIS Automatic Identification System Electronic Chart System (ECS) Software
Command Control Early Warning Software (Peace Eagle)
Interoperability and Interoperability Framework Projects
Avionics Video Symbols Generation Software (ALQ-178 AVSG)
Agent-Based Modelling and Simulation System (ETSIS)
Open Source Operating System (PARDUS)
Photogrammetric Map
Satellite imagery process and digital interpretation for the Air Force
Maintenance Data Computer
DDS Middleware
Orthophoto Map
Graphic Interface Unit (Senmot)
Tactical Military Planning Application (SimBox)
Simulation Systems Operation (SimLink)
Synthetic Tactical Simulation Software
Tactical Games
Software Development for Air Traffic Control/Management (ATC/ATM) Systems
Automatic Detection and Tracking Software
Performance of Engineering Calculations, Design of Modernization
High Resolution Satellite Image Analysis (DUPT)
Military Health Automation System (TAF)
Mission Computer Software Development
Embedded Software
Vehicle Tracking Software System
ETSIS: Agent-Based Modelling and Simulation System
Performance Prediction Modeling
Digital Elevation Model Software (DEM)
Building Heights and Density Analysis (İNTA)
Change Detection Analysis (İNTA)
Tracking Systems (İNTA)
Labris Antivirus / Antispam Gateway Software and Hardware
Labris Firewall, VPN, Bandwidth Management and High Availability Management Software and Hardware
Labris Intrusion Detection and Prevention Software and Hardware
Labris URL/Content filter Software and Hardware
Vehicle Tracking and Licence Plate Recognition Systems
Production of Visual Database Systems and 3D Models for Simulation Projects (İNTA)

Logistics

  Logistic support vehicles
Aircraft Refueller (18.000 L - 45.000 L)
Armoured Ambulance
Armoured Ambulance Vehicle (M113 A2T2)
Battle Tank Transporters
BMC 215-09 (4x4) EOD vehicle
BMC 235-16 (4x4) 5 tonnes Mobile Repair Workshop
BMC 235-16 (4x4) Shelter Carrier Vehicle
BMC PRO 624 (6x2) 15.000 LT Aircraft Refueler
BMC PRO 624 (6x2) 15.000 LT Fuel Tanker
BMC PRO 624 (6x2) 15.000 LT Water Tanker
BMC PRO 624 (6x2) 5 tonnes Recovery Vehicle
BMC PRO 827 (6x4) 20.000 LT Aircraft Refueler (1000 lpm)
BMC PRO 827 (6x4) 20.000 LT Aircraft Refueler (2271 lpm)
BMC PRO 832 (6x4) 5.000 USG Aircraft Refueler
Container Carrier with Portable Platform
Fishbone Type Container Trailer
Helicopter Refueller 10.000Lt
Hydraulic Refuse Truck
Incident Place Investigation Vehicle
Land Rover 110/130 Field Ambulance
Land Rover 130 Ammunition Vehicle
Land Rover 130 Maintenance Vehicle (Single / Crew Cab)
Land Rover 130 Rapier Battery Vehicle
Land Rover 130 Rescue Vehicle
Land Rover 130 Stinger Manpads Vehicle
Skip Loaders
Truck Platform Production, Front Crane, Shelter and Alternator Assemblies
Water Tank Truck 15 Ton
Water Tank Truck 5 Ton
  Airport and ground support equipment
Aircraft Arresting Net Barrier Systems
Aircraft Warning Light System GUIS-01a
Aircraft Warning Light System GUIS-01a
Aircraft Warning Light System GUIS-02
Aircraft Warning Light System GUIS-03
Airfield Lighting Equipments
Airfield Lighting System
Constant Current Regulator
Ground Power Unit
High Pressure Compressor
Isolating Transformers
Mobile Air Traffic Control Tower (MATCT - 5001)
Mobile Flood lighting Tower
Nitrogen servicing unit
Pallet Dolly (PD 7000)
Portable Airfield Lighting System
Tow Bar
  Material handling equipment, workshop machinery
Cold Storage Cabinet Trailer
Containers
ÇNRA (MLRS) Ammunition Trailer
Command Control Shelter Projects
Mobile Carrier Band
Mobile Field Both Trailer
NATO-I ACE-II Shelters
Oxygen, Argon, Nitrogen Tank, Trailers
Shelter
Shelterization, Mobilization and Ruggedization
SS-W-Platform Wagon for Tanks
Pallets For Carrying The Mobile Radars
Trailers
Water Trailer 1,5 tonnes
CNC, Universal and Heavy Industrial Machine Tools
Deep Drilling Machinery
Sheet Metal Working Machinery
  Field accommodation and catering equipment
Accommodation Containers
Adjustable Shelf Unit
Cold Climate Tent
Command Tent
Container
Containers - Office, Kitchen-Dining, Dormitory, Sanitary, etc.
Corridor of Hygiene
Desert WC
Emergency and Disaster Field Deployed WC System
Emergency Accommodation Buildings
Field Telephone
Field Type Tent Heater
General Purpose Tent
GSM Shelters
Headquarters' Tent
Mobile Bathroom Unit
Mobile Field Cooking Trailer
Mobile Kitchen, Mobile Field Hospitals, Caravans, Mobilevans, Trailer Mounted Water Purification Unit
Mobile Laundry Unit
Mobile Oven Unit
Power Box Containers - 150-450 kWh Generator Enclosures
Ration Packs, MRE's With 2 Years Shelf Life
Refrigeration Chamber on Trailer
Shelter
Single Room Country WC
Storage Containers - Small Material Storage Containers
Storage Tent
Tents
Watching Tent
Water Balloon (Vehicle Top)
Water Purification Equipment
Water Tank 5000 - 7000 lt
  Fire fighting and alarm equipment
BGS-700 Unit Security System
Modern Fire Extinguishing System
  Test equipment
Ampermeters
Auto Point II
Automatic Test Equipment (ATE)
Automatic test equipment (ATE) and Test program sets (TPS)
Automatic Test Program Generator
Automatic Test System (Robotics)
Calibration and repair
Calibration Services
Cosqmeter
Customer Oriented Special Test Equipment
Environmental Conditions Test
Environmental Tests, Arena Tests of warheads, Firing Tests, Design, production and testing of Flight termination systems
Establishment, System Integration and Engineering Services of EU Standard EMC (Electro Magnetic Compatibility) Laboratories.
Field Test System
Frequency Meter
Flight Test Instrumentation (FTI)
Gatelab 9000
Grenade Launcher Tester
Universal Relay Test Set (GTS-2300)
Inter V3
Internal Design of Military/Civil Shelters (Shelterization), Military Vehicles, Observation and Simulation Laboratories.
ITS-107 Electronic Intervalometer Test Set
Kalibrasyon (Electronic / Mechanical)
Pin Point II
Quality Control and Calibration Activities
Test Program Sets
Test Program Sets (TPS)
Test Programs and Interface Test Adaptors
Test Systems and Test Program Sets (TPS)
Test Equipment and Prototype Product
Varmeters
Voltmeters
Wattmeter
 Uniforms, protective clothing and equipment
3 XDRY Soldier Underwear Fabric
Air Forces Ceremony Sword
Backpack
Band Ceremony Garment (grand)
Band Ceremony Garment (summer)
Band Ceremony Garment (winter)
Boots for Firefighters
Boots for Motorcyclists
Boots for Summer
Boots for Winter
Camouflaged Parka
cargo Parachute
Coat Officer, NCO
Cold Weather Boots, Breathable
Cold Weather Gloves, Leather Gloves
Combat Backpack Fabric
Combat Camouflage Fabric (Cotton)
Combat Camouflage Fabric (Polyester)
Combat Camouflage Fabric (Cotton, Nylon)
Combat Camouflage Fabric 3 XDRY
Commando Camouflaged Dress (summer / winter)
Desert Boots
Desert Camouflage Fabric
Embroidery Materials
F.R. Police Dress
Gendarme Ceremony Sword
Hat, Mess Dress, Officer
Hat, Mess Dress, Officer, Lady
Hedik
Holsters, Police Belt, Rubber Goggles for Sun and Snow, Campbed
Inner Garment's Cap, Officer, NCO (summer / winter)
Laminated Polar Camouflage Fabric
Land Forces Ceremony Sword
Mess Dress, Officer
Multi Spectral Camouflage Net
Naval Forces Ceremony Sword
Naval Forces Student Rapier
NBC Fabric
Office Shoes for Winter and Summer
Officer Shirt Fabric
One Man Tent Fabric
Outer Garment (Officer, Co-Summer, Winter)
Outer Garment's Hat, Officer, NCO (summer / winter)
Overcoat Officer, NCO
Parachutes
Personnel Parachute
Pilot Suit Fabric (kermel)
Pilot Suit Fabric (cotton)
Polar Combat Suit Fabric
Polar Combat Tent And Windcheater Fabric
Safety Shoes
Sleeping Bag
Sport Shoes
Sword Belt Metal Part
Technical Textile Products for Military Usage
Tex-Therm
Training Camouflaged Dress (summer)
Training Camouflaged Dress (winter)
Ammunition Vest
Anti-Ballistic Plates, Waistcoat, Helmet, Vehicle Protection
Anti-Riot Baton
Anti-Riot Body Protector
Anti-Riot Helmet
Anti-Riot Shield
Armoured Cabin
Ballistic Glass
Ballistic Helmet
Ballistic Run Flat Tires
Ballistic Vest
Ballistics Protective Vest
Ballistic Helmet
West
Shield and Panels
Bomb Basket
Bomb Blanket
Bomb Blanket
Bomb Protecting Material
Bomb Shield
Bullet Proof Vest
Bulletproof Briefcase
Bulletproof Collapsible Shield Bag
Bulletproof Drapes
Bulletproof Executive Vest
Bulletproof Leather Coat
Bulletproof Means Material and Equipment
Bulletproof Protecting Clothes
Bulletproof Underwear Vest
Composite Helmet
Composite Helmet
Composite Vest
G Gas Mask SR 10 ST (With Water Equipment, Grey)
Gas Mask
Gas Mask SR 10
Gas Mask SR 10 G (Grey Gas Mask)
Gas Mask SR 10 ST (With Water Equipment)
Helmet
Industrial Type filters
Life Jacket
Life Vest
Mine Dress
NBC Air Filtration System
NBC filters - D12, D13
NBC Gas Mask and NBC filter Canisters
NBC Protective Clothing and Accessories
NBC Shelters and Fixed and Mobile Air Filtration and Pressurizing Systems
NBC Systems
Panoramic Gas Mask
Personal Protection Armor System
Physical Security System
Protective Pilot Helmet
Ballistic Protective Helmet (Aramid)
  Armouring and armouring materials
Armoured Glasses
Armoured Guard Houses And Checkpoints.
Armoured Vehicle Production
Ceramic Armor Systems (B4C, SIC, AL203, TIB2)
Ceramic- Composite Armor System (B4C-Aramid)
Ceramic Plate
Explosion-Proof Wall Coatings
Helicopter Armouring
Light Armored Vehicles -VIP Vehicles and Tanks
Vehicle Armoring
Ta

Parts and components manufacturing

  Mechanical manufacturing
Adjuster, Seat for Tanks and Armoured Vehicles
Air Handling Units
Aircraft and Helicopter Parts
Aircraft Body Stretching Die
Aircraft Engine Parts
Aircraft Hydraulic System Parts
Aircraft/Helicopter Structural and Landing Gear parts
Aluminum Alloy Products
Aluminum Brazing Condenser for Tanks and Armoured Vehicles
Aluminum Brazing Heater for Tanks and Armoured Vehicles
Aluminum Brazing Intercooler for Tanks and Armoured Vehicles
Aluminum Brazing Oil/Fuel Cooler for Tanks and Armoured Vehicles
Aluminum Brazing Radiator for Tanks and Armoured Vehicles
Aluminum Heat Shields Production
Aluminum Hydraulic Tank
Aluminum Mechanical Heater for Tanks and Armoured Vehicles
Aluminum Mechanical Radiator for Tanks and Armoured Vehicles
Ammunition And Weapon Parts
Angle
Armoured Plates (AL 7075)
Assembled Part Production
Auxiliary Power Unit
Blowers
Bolt - ASME 18.2.1
Bolt - ASME 18.2.2
Bolt - DIN 439-2 - ISO 4035 - DIN 936 - ISO 8675
Bolt - DIN 6921 - EN 1665 - ISO 4162 - EN 1662
Bolt - DIN 6923
Bolt - DIN 7984
Bolt - DIN 7991 - ISO 10642
Bolt - DIN 912 - ISO 4762
Bolt - DIN 928
Bolt - DIN 929
Bolt - DIN 931 - DIN 960 - ISO 4014 - ISO 8765
Bolt - DIN 933 - DIN 961 - ISO 4017 - ISO 867
Bolt - DIN 934 - ISO 4032 - DIN 8673
Bolt - DIN 980/v
Bolt - DIN 985 - DIN 982
Bolt - ISO 7380
Bomb Cartridge 40 mm
Bottom and Upper Rollers, Idlers, Sprockets and Sprocket Segments
Bracket Assembly, Bump Stop for Tanks and Armoured Vehicles
Bracket, Engine Mount for Tanks and Armoured Vehicles
Brake Valves
Brush Set
Campane
Cap Recuperator, Lever Antibacklash, Housingcam, Operating Breech
Case&Relay
Chip removing, Castings, Heat-Treatment Sheet Welding Works, Industrial Parts for Defence and Automative Industry
Clip
Coating of Engine Bearings
Cold Formed Stamping Part Production
Colored Smoke Can (2 kg Smoke, H/B Type Colored, Colored)
Component
Compressor
Cooling Module for Tanks and Armoured Vehicles
Copper Alloys Products
Copper Heater for Tanks and Armoured Vehicles
Copper Radiator for Tanks and Armoured Vehicles
Cover, Access for Tanks and Armoured Vehicles
Crankcase-Tractor Parts
Crankshafts
Cylinder blocks
Cylinder Heads
Design, Manufacturing and Assembly of Rubber, Rubber to Metal Parts
Design, Manufacturing, Assembly and Repair of Tools and Dies
Design, Manufacturing, Assembly and Repair of Welding Machines and Presses
Design, Manufacturing, Assembly of Structural and Dynamic Parts for Land, Naval and Air Platforms
Design, Modeling, Moulding And Production of Composite Parts (CAD/CAM) for Defense Industry
Differential and Steering Boxes
Disc, Clutch for Tanks and Armoured Vehicles
Door, Hatch, Vehicle for Tanks and Armoured Vehicles
Dredging Buckets
Electro-Optics Coolers
Engine balancers systems
Engine Cylinder Liners
Engine Parts
Entry Door Panel
Exhaust Manifold
Exhaust Valve
Fan Motor Shroud Assembly for Tanks and Armoured Vehicles
Fence Wire
Filler, Neck, Flanged
Final Drive Housing and Cover
Fire Periscope
Firing Lever, Security Pin, Firing Pin, Plunger
Gasket Manufacturing
Gear Box Rings and Hubs for Multiple Vehicles
Geared Group
General Casting and Lathe Works
Heat Exchangers
Heat Recovery Units
Heater and HVAC System for Tanks and Armoured Vehicles
Heavy Duty Brake Systems
High Precision Machined Components
Hinge
Holder Assembly Electrical Contact
Hose Assemblies
Hot Forgings and Various Mechanical Parts
Housing Cam Cover, Retractor, Conductor, Plunger Firing
Housing Mechanical for Tanks and Armoured Vehicles
Housing, Bearing
Housing, Steering Column for Tanks and Armoured Vehicles
Hub And Drum Assembly for Tanks and Armoured Vehicles
Ignition Unit, Manifold
Impact And Casting Parts For 155 mm Anti-Tank Cargo Ammunition
Kinetic Energy Transporter
Lagerbock
Lifting Eye, Vehicle for Tanks and Armoured Vehicles
M52 Modernization - KomBitriger
M52 Tk/M Howitzer And Tank Parts
Machining
Machining
Manifold, Discharge for Tanks and Armoured Vehicles
Manufacturing of Various Machinery Parts
Manufacturing Services
Mechanic Parts for Electronic, Electromechanic, Optics, Optomechanics and Avionic Equipment
Mechanical Components For AB-139 Agusta Helicopter
Mechanical Components For AN/AVS 6 Aviator's Goggle
Mechanical Components For ASELFLIR 200 Airborne Thermal Imaging System
Mechanical Components For ASIR Thermal Imaging System
Mechanical Components For EAGLEEYE - Fire Control Sighting System
Mechanical Components For FALCONEYE Electro - Optical Sensor System
Mechanical Components For Multi Pulse Laser Range Finder
Mechanical Components For Peace Eagle
Mechanical Components For PRC-9651 Multiband Multimode Hand-Held Radio
Mechanical Components For Target Acquisition System
Mechanical Components For Thermal Weapon Sight
Mechanical Part Production For Defence Industry
Mechanical Manufacturing
Mechanism Rifle Building
Metal Tooling and Fixtures
Metallic And Composite Component Production and Assembly
Mortar Body and Barrel 40 mm
Mount, Machine Gun for Tanks and Armoured Vehicles
Mölds and Spare Parts of Moulds
Multiple Rocket Launcher Systems Front, Intermediate and Carrier Frame
Chemical warfare agent detection system
Oil Coolers
Oil Pumps for Engines
Parts For Armoured Combat Vehicles
Pedal, Brake for Tanks and Armoured Vehicles
Pedestal, Seat for Tanks and Armoured Vehicles
Pipe Post
Pipe Prop
Pitman Arms
Planet Gear
Plastic Injection Parts For Defence Industry
Power Steering Systems
Pre-Heaters
Precision Machined Structural parts
Precision Machining for Defence, Aerospace and Electronics Industries,
Preset, Shot Peening and Fatigue Test Machines
Production of Cutting Tools
Production of Various Parts for Armored Combat Vehicles and Electronic Equipment
Production Services
Pulley Frame
Pulley Groove
Quality Steel Castings and Various Mechanical Parts
Relay
Roadwheel Leopard MBT
Screw, C-Bar
Separator, Air, Cooling, System for Tanks and Armoured Vehicles
Solenoid
Special fasteners Bolts and Nuts in Inch and Metric (AN, NAS, MS, DIN / EN)
Speed Reducer Case
Spindle, Dual Support Roller for Tanks and Armoured Vehicles
Stabilizator Bar
Storm Fırtına Roadwheel (T 155 K/M TUSpH)
Supply and Return Fans
Support Part
Tandem Axle
Tank Crankshaft (M48 A5 T2)
Tanks and Armoured vehicles components
Thermostat Brace
Track (T417A)
Track (T517A)
Tube Assemblies
Turbo Charge Air Coolers
Turret Traverse And Elevation Mechanisms
Vane Pumps
Various Bronze Products
Welded Part Production
Welding
Window parts for Aeroplanes
Workpiece carrier and Pallets
Workpiece Product
 Electrical and electronic manufacturing
AC voltage transducer (ggt - 01)
Active power transducer (gwt-01)
Air ionizers - dr. bio-tron
Ammeter (analogue)
Ammeter (digital)
Ampermeter (digital)
Automatic re-closing relay
Auxiliary relay with horn contact
Balun
Bare short circuit and earthing equipment
Battery box
Born connectors and buksel sockets
Brushless alternator (n1301)
Cabinet and roof cooler fan
Cable
Cable and harness
Cable harness
Cable harness
Cable harnesses
Cable harnesses
Cable launcher projector
Cable wiring
Capacitor
Cast resin type (dry-type) transformers
Circuit simulator (digital - analog)
Communication cable harnesses
Compensation systems
Connector
Connector
Control ignition, heater
Cooler fan
Copper data
Copper telecom cables
Cosifimeter (digital)
Cos-phi meter / frequency meter (digital)
Current and voltage transducers
Current monitoring relays
Current relay (2 phase 1 ground over), current relay (3 phase 1 ground over)
Current transducer (gat-01)
Current transformer
DC leakage relay
Deployable fiber optic cable reel
Diesel fuel pump driven by permanent magnet dc motor
Differential relay
Digital and analog voice logging cards
Disco sound limiter and monitor/db-meter (analog)
Disco sound limiter and monitor/db-meter (digital)
Distribution box
Dynamic type frequency converter
Electric fan motor
Electric panel
Electrical and telephone distribution boxes
Electrical components
Electro-mechanical components
Electronic box assembly
Electronic card assembly
Electronic component
Electronic modules
Electronically card services
Electronics cards
Energymeter (digital)
ESD (electrostatic) materials
Ethernet routing switch 5000 series
Ethernet switch 325
Ethernet switch 425
F/O data
Fiber optic cables
Fiber optic distribution box
Fixed switching and call management systems
Frekansmeter (analogue)
Frekansmeter (digital)
Frequency meter with vibrating-reed
Ground relay
Harmonic analyser
Harness
Harness
Harness
Heat control instruments
Heater cable harnesses (ABB)
High voltage devices
High voltage substation systems
Igniter spark fuel
Industrial robots servo motor cooler fan
In-line centrifugal duct fan
Insulated pliers
LED displays
Line short circuit and earthing equipment with optical head
Liquid level controller
Low voltage cubicles
Low voltage current transformers
Lux adjustable photocell relay
Medium voltage switchgear
Motor current
Motor protection relay
Multimeter (digital)
Network analyser
Optic reviewer cable harnesses
Optical voltage detector
Over and low voltage relay
Overcurrent protection relays
Phase ac current transducer (GAT 03 3)
Phase failure relays
Phase sequence / frequency / thermistor relays
Photocell switch
Power factor controller
Power line filter (PCF-3 equipment tempest)
Power quality products and software
Power transmission and distribution cable harnesses
Powermeter (digital)
Printed circuit board (PCB)
Protection relays
Reactive power transducer (gqt-01)
Regulator voltage
Ruggedized lcd display 12"
Ruggedized lcd display 18"
Scavenge blower
Screen
Sensenode
Space and metal detector (avci xm-1)
Sunt
Switch
Switch pressure
Switch sensitive
Switchboard
Tandem type differential pressure fan
Tank protection relay
Telescopic optic voltage detector
Tent stove 45,000 BTU
Thruscan s3, Thruscan S9, Thruscan Sx, Thruscan Sx-I, Thruscan SX-WP
Thruscan, Thruscan DX-X, Thruscan DX
Time relay
Time relay (digital)
Toggle switch
Top of data station
Top panel
TRB, TRK inflaming cable harnesses
Vacuum circuit braker or contactor
Varmeter (analogue)
Ventilator motor
Video and data recorder (digital)
Vme work stations
Voltage monitoring relays
Voltage regulator
Voltmeter (analogue)
Voltmeter (digital)
Voltmeter (digital)
Wattmeter (analogue)
Wattmeter (digital)
Wide band antenna (100/400 w)
Wire - cable assembly
Wire/cable assembly
  Paints, chemicals and composite material
Composite Materials
Carbon cleaner
Composite Ballistic Equipment
Composite Parts For High Temperature Applications
Composite/Hybrid Add-On Armor Plates
Camouflage Paint (IR)
Degreaser 10 K
Disinfectant cleaner aero
Electrowide
Electron
Form EX 4500 PU
Gear and Slideway Oils
Gear Oils
Hydraulic Oils
Marine Engine Oils
Metal clean
Monograde Motor Oils
Multigrade Motor Oils
Leak proof
Rust Preventives
Paint stripper gel
Penetrating Plus
Piece clean sol
Pro clean
PROCON
Safe sweeper
SLS Plus
Tetrasonic 119 CL
Special Industrial Oils
Semi finished Plastics Products
Transmission Oils
WRP 10 WT
Composite Part / Component Design, Analysis and Production
Unmanned Aerial Vehicles Internal Combustion Engines
 Power supplies, engines and batteries
Aircraft battery 20HP25H1CR
Aircraft battery (F19/40H1C)
Aircraft battery (F20/12H1CT)
Aircraft battery (F20/15H1C)
Aircraft battery (F20/15H1C-2)
Aircraft battery (F20/15H1CT-2)
Aircraft battery (F20/17H1C)
Aircraft battery (F20/17H1C-2)
Aircraft battery (F20/17H1CT)
Aircraft battery (F20/17H1CT-2)
Aircraft battery (F20/22H1C-1)
Aircraft battery (F20/22H1C-2)
Aircraft battery (F20/25H1CTF)
Aircraft battery (F20/27H1CM)
Aircraft battery (F20/27H1CM1)
Aircraft battery (F20/27H1Cm2)
Aircraft battery (F20/27H1CM3)
Aircraft battery (F20/40H1C)
Aircraft battery (F20/40H1CE1WT(H))
Aircraft battery (F20/40H1CTF)
Aircraft battery (F20/7H1CT4)
Aircraft battery Cell (FP12H1C)
Aircraft battery Cell (FP15H1C)
Aircraft battery Cell (FP17H1C)
Aircraft battery Cell (FP17H1C)
Aircraft battery Cell (FP22H1C)
Aircraft battery Cell (FP25H1C)
Aircraft battery Cell (FP27H1C)
Aircraft battery Cell (FP40H1C)
Aircraft battery Cell (FP7H1C)
Alternator
Alternator
Alternator (Generator)
Auxiliary Power Unit (APU)
Battery block - 4211
Battery block - 7221
Battery block - 7231
Battery block (GP-300, HT800, P-110, SABER II)
Battery block 1000 mAh - 4811/4815
Battery block 1200 mAh - 4011/4015
Battery block 1700 mAh - 4011/4015
Battery block 600 mAh - 4811/4815
Battery block Li-ion - (7,5 V 1900 mAh)
Battery block (NI-MH 7,5 V 1900 mAh)
Battery charger (GAR-110)
Battery charger (GRR-1110d 110 V DC 10-25A MONOPHASE)
Battery charger And Maintenance Free Battery Unit (GAR-24)
Battery charger GRR 1000 Series Monophase
Battery charger GRR-3000 Series Threephase
Canopy and Deep Isolation Genset
Combined chargers
Diesel Electrogen Sets
Diesel Engine
Diesel generators
Diesel Genset
Diesel Motorpomps
En power 33 Diamond 10-300 kVA-
Enpower 11 5-15 kVA-
Enpower 31 5-15 kVA/10-40 kVA-
Frequency generator
Gasoline (Portable) Genset
Generating Set
Generator
Generator Gas Powered
Generators
Generators-Cogeneration
Generators-Diesel
Generators-LPG&NG
Generators-Mobil Dual generator sets (Military)
Generators-Portable (Gasoline)
Ground Power Unit (GPU)
Laser Range Finder Battery block
Lighting Tower
Marconi Hf Ssb Battery block
Military Type Dual Electrogen Sets
Mobile Floodlight Tower
Mobile Genset
Power Distribution and Control Units
Private Genset
Racal Battery block
Shelter Power Supply
Standard Genset
Starter
Starter
Switched Mode DSP Controlled Power Supplies
Switched Mode Power Supplies
Synchronous Diesel Electrogen Sets
Water Cooled Diesel Engines
Welder generator
 Other manufacturing
2 Section Accordion Barrier System
9 Section Accordion Barrier System
Bellows
Cabinet 19"
Cabinet Accessories 19"
Cabinets 19"
Cable Protection HDPE Double-Walled (STB Ø110)
Cathode
Composite Antenna Mast
Disc Wheel for Leopard Tank
Disc Wheel for M48-M60 Tank
Electrolytic Copper Flat Wire
Ex-Proof Fans For Explosion Areas
Flexible Air Duct
Foam Metal
Gasket
Gasket
GENESIS; SHM Maket Çalışması
Investment Casting
Incident Place Investigation Equipment
Lens
Lighting Tower
Main Tyre for Military Aircraft
Nose Tyre - Military Aircraft
Optical fine film Coating
Oxygen and Nitrogen Gases Production
Prisms
Rack Mountable Pc Chassis
Racks and Its Appliances
Roundwire
Rugged Cabinets - Military Type
Sand - Resin Mixture
Seats - Driver/Operator
Security System For Garrison And Headquarters For Military
shock mounts
Single Piece Tractor and Agricultural Wheels
Special rubber components with high chemical resistance
Special rubber components with high electrical conductivity or isolation capability
Standard and nonstandard additives and special slicat components with high thermal resistance
Switch Box - Field Type
T-155 mm K/M Fırtına Disc Cap
T-155 mm K/M Fırtına Disc Wheel
Tin Coated Wire
Tubes
Tyre (DT-2)
Tyre (HL10)
Tyre (PA-40)
Tyre (PN-30)
Tyre Multiple Purpose (FLT-2)
Various sealing elements: o-rings, nutrings, bellows, grommets, gaskets
Vehicle Wheels
Wheels for Specially Designed Military Jeeps

See also
Modern equipment and uniform of the Turkish Army
Turkish Armed Forces
Turkish Army
Turkish Navy
Turkish Air Force
Turkish Gendarmerie
Defense industry

References

Sources
https://web.archive.org/web/20081221175824/http://www2.ssm.gov.tr/katalog2007/eng/urunler.html
http://www.ssm.gov.tr/EN/savunmasanayiimiz/Pages/BugunkuDurum.aspx
http://www.ssm.gov.tr/EN/savunmasanayiimiz/Pages/Tarihce.aspx

 
 
Turkish military-related lists
Turkey